Victoria & Albert's is a restaurant in Disney's Grand Floridian Resort & Spa at Walt Disney World Resort, named after Queen Victoria and Albert, Prince Consort. The restaurant opened in 1988 and the restaurant's menu changes seasonally, but may vary nightly.

Ratings

Victoria & Albert's has received AAA's Five Diamond Award every year since 2000 and currently is one of three restaurants in Florida to receive the award. Victoria & Albert's is also ranked as the number two fine dining restaurant in the United States by TripAdvisor, behind only Daniel in New York City. In February 2018, it received the prestigious Forbes Travel Guide Five-Star Award and is currently the only restaurant in the state of Florida to receive both the AAA Five Diamond and Forbes Travel Guide Five-Star awards.

Important information
As of January 2008, children under 10 years of age are no longer permitted to dine at Victoria & Albert's. Disney said this was done in response to diner surveys.

Victoria & Albert's remained closed during the phased reopening of Walt Disney World as a result of the COVID-19 pandemic. It reopened on July 28, 2022.

References

External links
 

Walt Disney World restaurants
Restaurants established in 1988
Fine dining
1988 establishments in Florida